Two ships of the Royal Navy have been named HMS Orange, after the House of Orange-Nassau:

  was a 32-gun fifth rate captured from the Dutch Navy in 1665 and lost in 1671.
  was a 6-gun fireship captured in 1672 and burnt in an accident in 1673.

See also

References
 

Royal Navy ship names